Margaret "Maye" Dilke born Margaret Mary Smith became "Mrs. William Russell Cooke" (4 September 1857 – 19 May 1914) was a British writer and campaigner for women's rights.

Life
Dilke was born in 1857. Her parents were Martha Mary (born Dalrymple) and Thomas Eustace Smith. Her father owned Newcastle shipping interests and he was a Liberal MP for Tynemouth (1868–85). Her parents travelled widely and they were patrons of the arts and this included particularly the Pre-Raphaelites. She had five other sisters and they were educated at home as well as in Lausanne in Switzerland. Margaret also went to Orleans, where she qualified herself as a French teacher.

Margaret married in 1876 Ashton Wentworth Dilke. Her sister Virginia who had a talent for languages married a Scottish lawyer named Donald Crawford who become MP for North-East Lanarkshire on 27 July 1881. In 1878 Margaret joined the National Society for Women's Suffrage as sat on its executive. 

Dilke's husband resigned his seat in parliament in 1883 as he had tuberculosis. He died that year in Algiers. Her husband's brother Charles became the guardian of their children. In 1885 her sister, Virginia, told her husband, Donald, that she had an affair with Sir Charles Dilke, 2nd Baronet, Margaret's brother-in-law. The divorce destroyed her reputation, that of Sir Charles Dilke and eventually involved her mother Ellen Dilke and her sister's real lover. The divorce led to two court cases which attracted much interest.

Dilke's sister, Virginia's, messy divorce completed in 1885 and after a trip abroad she returned to England, where she stayed with Maye. Virginia was a social pariah and Maye interceded by obtaining work for her with W. T. Stead. He was the editor of Pall Mall Gazette.

In 1888 she went to Washington to attend the first International Council of Women. The conference was not about suffrage as this was too contentious but involved 49 delegates who were women leaders from nine countries.

In 1891, she married William Russell Cooke and she had two more children. Her husband was a solicitor who had founded Russell-Cooke Solicitors in 1880 with his brother.

Death and legacy
Dilke died a widow in Newport in 1914. Dilke had published a book titled "Women's Suffrage" in 1885. The book went through the usual reasons given for giving women the vote and justifying women's demand for equality. It was published as a volume in Charles Buxton's Imperial Parliament series.

References

British suffragists
1857 births
1914 deaths
19th-century British non-fiction writers
19th-century British women writers
19th-century British writers
British women non-fiction writers